The Vermont Ski and Snowboard Museum is a museum located in Brandon, Vermont. It was founded in 1988 as The Vermont Ski Museum. In 2000, the museum moved to Stowe and opened to the public at its current location in 2002. 

In 2011, the word snowboarding was added to the museum's name. Currently, the museum changes exhibits annually, with the exception of the Hall of Fame.

The museum's main objective is to "collect, preserve, and celebrate Vermont's skiing and snowboarding history." It's mission is:

Location
The museum building was originally located in the 1818 Old Town Hall, but was moved during the 1860s. The museum is now located in the Perkins Building at 1 South Main Street, Stowe, Vermont. A complete renovation took place in 2002.

Collection
, the museum offers a broad programming schedule, which comes in support of its collection containing 7,500 items, divided into seven different areas, together with comprehensive historical descriptions: 
 Ski and snowboard equipment
 Ski and snowboard clothing
 Mechanical equipment
 Vermont Ski Area – specific location items
 The 10th Mountain Division area
 The Fine art area
 The Related Library and Archival materials section includes over 800 items

The museum is participating in the digitization of historical films and collection of interviews. These resources might be made available to the general public.

To maintain the collections, the museum undertakes preservation activities, rotates exhibits, and makes them accessible to the general public.

Events
In addition to the exhibits, the museum hosts several annual events including the Stowe Mountain Film Festival, the VT Antique Alpine Race, the VT Antique Nordic Race, the Epic Summer Event, and the presentation of the Paul Robbins Ski Journalism Award.

Hall of Fame
The museum awards the Vermont Ski and Snowboard Hall of Fame.

Hall of Fame inductees

Paul Robbins Journalism Award

Gallery

References

External links

1988 establishments in Vermont
Museums established in 1988
Ski museums and halls of fame
Sports museums in Vermont
Museums in Lamoille County, Vermont
Libraries in Vermont
Buildings and structures in Stowe, Vermont
Skiing in Vermont
Skiing in the United States
Snowboarding